Probable ATP-dependent RNA helicase DDX46 is an enzyme that in humans is encoded by the DDX46 gene.

Function 

This gene encodes a member of the DEAD box protein family. DEAD box proteins, characterized by the conserved motif Asp-Glu-Ala-Asp (DEAD), are putative RNA helicases. They are implicated in a number of cellular processes involving alteration of RNA secondary structure, such as translation initiation, nuclear and mitochondrial splicing, and ribosome and spliceosome assembly. Based on their distribution patterns, some members of this family are believed to be involved in embryogenesis, spermatogenesis, and cellular growth and division. The protein encoded by this gene is a component of the 17S U2 snRNP complex; it plays an important role in pre-mRNA splicing.

Interactions 

DDX46 has been shown to interact with SF3A2.

References

Further reading